Super bubble may refer to:

 Superbubble, an astronomical term for a large low-density region of the interstellar medium created by stellar winds
 Super Bubble, a brand of bubble gum
 Super Bubble Pop, a video game
 Super Bubble Bobble, an advanced mode in the game Bubble Bobble